Augustine Abbey, also known as Idikoko, is a Ghanaian actor and movie maker known for comedy.  His is also known for his main roles as a house boy or gate man. He has produced and starred in a BBC documentary and also directed and produced a film on HIV and AIDS in partnership with UNESCO and Esi Sutherland-Addy's MMOFRA Foundation.

He runs Great Idikoko Ventures and is married to fellow actress Linda Quashiga. He attended Presbyterian Boys' Secondary School.

Filmography

Films

Awards and nominations
Augustine Abbey has won the following awards

References

Ghanaian male film actors
People from Accra
20th-century Ghanaian male actors
Presbyterian Boys' Senior High School alumni
21st-century Ghanaian male actors